Daniel Jensen (born 8 May 1985) is a former Danish professional football defender.

External links
Career statistics at Danmarks Radio

1985 births
Living people
Danish men's footballers
FC Nordsjælland players
FC Fredericia players
Danish Superliga players
People from Hillerød Municipality
Association football defenders
Sportspeople from the Capital Region of Denmark